(born January 9, 1991 in Fukuoka) is a Japanese former professional baseball player who played for the Yomiuri Giants in Japan's Nippon Professional Baseball from 2012 to 2015. His younger brother Taiga is also a professional baseball player currently playing for Fukuoka SoftBank Hawks. His father Eiichi is a former professional baseball player.

In October, 2015, Kasahara was named as a result of an investigation conducted by the Giants into illegal betting on professional and high school baseball games by its players. On 9 November 2015, the Giants organization terminated Kasahara's contract, along with fellow pitchers Satoshi Fukuda and Ryuya Matsumoto. The investigation found that Kasahara introduced the other two players to a graduate school student that facilitated the betting. On 10 November the NPB league commissioner penalized the three players with indefinite disqualification. Under league rules, Kasahara will be able to apply for readmission to the league after 5 years if he satisfies the commissioner that he is remorseful for his actions. The disqualification extends to American Major League Baseball and the professional leagues in China, Korea and Taiwan. The players avoided permanent disqualification because the investigation found no evidence that they were involved in fixing matches.

The Giants were also fined ¥10 million over the incident and the team's representative at the NPB, Atsushi Harasawa, resigned to take responsibility.

External links

NPB stats

References

1991 births
Living people
Baseball people from Fukuoka Prefecture
Japanese expatriate baseball players in Puerto Rico
Nippon Professional Baseball pitchers
Yomiuri Giants players
Cangrejeros de Santurce (baseball) players
Gigantes de Carolina players